Rade D. Paravina (born May 14, 1962) is a Serbian-American professor at School of Dentistry (UTSD), University of Texas Health Science Center at Houston (UTHealth). He serves as the director of the Houston Center for Biomaterials & Biomimetics and holds the Ralph C. Cooley DDS, Distinguished Professorship in Biomaterials.

Career 
Paravina graduated from the University of Niš School of Medicine, where he subsequently completed a three-year residency in prosthodontics and earned his master's and doctoral degree, and joined the UTSD in 2000. He designed and developed several dental products and tests and together with VITA Zahnfabrik designed two shade guides, Linearguide 3D Master and Bleachedguide 3D Master. He has developed Dental Color Matcher, an online evaluating training program for esthetic dentistry, and the scientific protocol for evaluating the "chameleon effect" of dental materials.

He serves as Editor-in-Chief of the Journal of Esthetic and Restorative Dentistry and editorial board member of the Journal of Dentistry, Journal of Prosthetic Dentistry, International Journal of Prosthodontics, and the American Journal of Dentistry.

He is a founder and past president of the Society for Color and Appearance in Dentistry (SCAD), director in the Executive Council of the American Academy of Esthetic Dentistry (AAED), and fellow of SCAD, AAED, and the American Association for Dental Research (AADR).

Selected publications  
 Paravina, R. and Powers, J. Esthetic Color Training in Dentistry (2004)
 Chu, S., Devigus, A., Paravina, R., and Mieleszko, A. Fundamentals of Color: Shade Matching and Communication in Esthetic Dentistry (2004) – co-editor
 Chu, S., Sailer, I., Paravina, R., and Mieleszko, A. Color in Dentistry – A Clinical Guide to Predictable Esthetics (2017) – co-editor
 Paravina, R. Understanding Color (chapter in Ronald E. Goldstein's "Esthetics in Dentistry", pp. 270–294) (2018)

References 

1962 births
Living people
People from Houston
Dentistry
American dentists
American dentistry academics
American medical researchers